The Journal of Latin American Geography is a triannual peer-reviewed academic journal published by the University of Texas Press on behalf of the Conference of Latin Americanist Geographers. The journal is abstracted and indexed by Scopus.

References

External links 

Online access at Project MUSE

Geography journals
University of Texas Press academic journals
Triannual journals